Ben Seabrook (born 2 December 1998) is an English cricketer. He made his first-class debut on 7 April 2018 for Cambridge MCCU against Essex as part of the Marylebone Cricket Club University fixtures.

References

External links
 

1998 births
Living people
English cricketers
Cambridge MCCU cricketers
Cambridgeshire cricketers
English cricketers of the 21st century